The electoral history of Creigh Deeds, Virginia State Senator.

House of Delegates races

State Senate races

Statewide races

References

Deeds, Creigh